Below is a list of all the Oceanian countries, in order of geographical area. Oceania's total geographical area is 2 (including the Oceania part of Indonesia).

Countries 

Note: Indonesia is considered a transcontinental country, the majority of its territory is located in Asia. Indonesia is marked with an asterisk (*) and is ranked by the area of its parts within Oceania only.

Territories
These territories, also located in Oceania, are not sovereign nations but are colonies of European, North American, and Oceanian countries and still under control of France, the United Kingdom, the United States, Australia, and New Zealand.

See also
List of Oceanian countries by population
List of Oceanian islands by area
List of African countries by area
List of Asian countries by area
List of European countries by area
List of North American countries by area
List of South American countries by area

References

Countries by geographical area
Oceanian countries
Area

Lists of countries in Oceania